The 1933 Marquette Golden Avalanche football team was an American football team that represented Marquette University as an independent during the 1933 college football season. In its 12th season under head coach Frank Murray, the team compiled a 3–4–1 record and was outscored by a total of 82 to 62. The team played its home games at Marquette Stadium in Milwaukee.

Frank Murray was Marquette's head football coach for 19 years and was posthumously inducted into the College Football Hall of Fame in 1983.

Schedule

References

Marquette
Marquette Golden Avalanche football seasons
Marquette Golden Avalanche football